Chile Route 255, known locally as Ruta CH-255, is a national route that is located in the region of Magallanes in southern Chile. The route begins at the Paso Integración Austral in Monte Aymond and ends at Gobernardor Phillipi in Puntas Arenas. In Argentina, the route continues as National Route 3.

References

Roads in Chile
Transport in Magallanes Region